Wiz 'n' Liz: The Frantic Wabbit Wescue is a platform game developed by Raising Hell Software for the Amiga and Sega Mega Drive and published by Psygnosis in 1993. It is a humorous, cutesy platform game. With the exception of some end-of-level bosses, the game contains no enemies.

Gameplay 

The game takes place on a series of levels, each divided into eight worlds. Each world has a distinct graphical style and music, but the basic gameplay remains the same. Wiz and/or Liz must run through the landscape collecting wabbits against a strict time limit. To win, the player must collect floating letters that appear when a wabbit is collected to spell out a magic word shown at the top of the screen. Once an entire word is collected, the player then must rescue all remaining wabbits on the level, who now release collectable fruit, stars, and clocks to increase the time limit. The limit starts at three minutes and is only restarted when the player character dies. This time limit can however be extended by collecting a glowing orange orb which appears in the last ten seconds of a countdown and gives thirty seconds of bonus time.

At the end of each stage, collected fruit can be mixed in a cauldron and depending on the fruit, the effect can be bonus points, a minigame, a weird graphical effect, a bit of silliness (such as declaring a "Game Over" and killing the player's character, only to put them back with a sheepish "Only joking..."), turning the wabbits different colours, or "Absolutely Nothing".

Wiz 'n' Liz features a number of cameo appearances from other Psygnosis characters, including Puggsy and Lemmings.

The bonus game was featured in the original mid-90s run of the competitive gaming television show Games World (broadcast on Sky One in the UK) as one of the challenges. Players took turns to play the bonus game of collecting the blue wabbits and the highest scorer won that particular challenge.

Plot
Wiz 'n' Liz takes place on the magical planet of Pum, where a group of "wabbits" (rabbits) have been taken by a spell gone awry and it's the job of two wizards – Wiz and Liz – to rescue them.

Reception

A review from the SEGA MegaZone magazine described the game as 'cute, original and very, very fast'. Amiga Action described the game as 'an all out, fast action platform extravaganza, with nice graphics and sound and an endearing storyline'.

References

External links

1993 video games
Amiga games
Bizarre Creations games
Cooperative video games
Fantasy video games
Fictional duos
Multiplayer and single-player video games
Platform games
Psygnosis games
Sega Genesis games
Side-scrolling platform games
Video games about old age
Video games about witchcraft
Video games developed in the United Kingdom
Video games featuring female protagonists
Video games scored by Matt Furniss
Wizards in fiction